The Blohm & Voss P 178 was a German jet-powered dive bomber/fighter-bomber of unusual asymmetric form, proposed during World War II.

Overview
This asymmetrically-designed dive bomber had one Junkers Jumo 004B turbojet located under the wing to the starboard side of the fuselage. The pilot sat in a cockpit in the forward fuselage, with a large fuel tank located to the rear of the cockpit. Beneath the fuel tank, there was a deep recess in which an SC 500 bomb could be carried within the fuselage, or an SC 1000 bomb which would protrude slightly out of the fuselage. Two solid-fuel auxiliary rockets extended from the rear, used for take-off. Two 15  mm (.60 in) MG 151 cannons were located in the nose.

Specifications

See also
List of German aircraft projects, 1939–45

References

External links
Secret Projects; Blohm und Voss P.178

Asymmetrical aircraft
P 178
Research and development in Nazi Germany
Abandoned military aircraft projects of Germany
1940s German attack aircraft